Keith Sequeira (born 30 April 1980) is an Indian actor, and a former model and VJ. He modeled for Raymond's The Complete Man campaign before gaining popularity as VJ Keith on B4U. He featured in the music video "Shake It Daddy" with Ayesha Takia and played the lead role in the soap opera Dekho Magar Pyaar Se on Star Plus. He made his movie debut with Sixteen (2013) and acted in Calendar Girls (2015). He was a contestant in the reality television show Bigg Boss 9.

Career

Sequeira modelled for Raymond's The Complete Man campaign. He then became a B4U VJ and hosted several shows, gaining popularity as "VJ Keith". He has also anchored several lifestyle shows on TV, including AXN’s Men 2.0, Thailand t-off, VH1's Club Class, live coverage of Super Fight League on Star Sports.

Sequeira made his film debut with Sixteen directed by Raj Purohit in 2013. He also played Officer Roy in the television serial Diya Aur Baati Hum.

Keith in Bigg Boss 9
Sequeira was among the fourteen contestants in the ninth season of the reality television show Bigg Boss, which began airing in October 2015. Keith Sequeira had to leave the show midway through due to a family emergency but he made his reentry to Bigg Boss House as the birthday gift of Rochelle Rao.

Personal life

Sequeira was born in Delhi to natives of Goa.

He was married to former actress Samyuktha Singh in 2005. They separated in 2011 due to creative differences. 

In 2015, his girlfriend, Rochelle Rao, participated in Bigg Boss 9: Double Trouble with him. The couple were married in March 2018 in a private ceremony in Mahaballipuram in Tamil Nadu. They went on to compete in Season 9 of the reality dance competition Nach Baliye in 2019.

Filmography

Films

Television

Music videos

References

External links

 

 

Indian male models
Male actors in Hindi cinema
Indian male film actors
Indian male television actors
Living people
Alumni of the London College of Fashion
Male actors from Delhi
Goan people
21st-century Indian male actors
Bigg Boss (Hindi TV series) contestants
1980 births